Arun Kumar Yadav is an Indian politician and a member of Bihar Legislative Assembly of India. He represents the Saharsa constituency in Saharsa district of Bihar, he was elected in 2015 as a member of Rashtriya Janata Dal. He also participated in Bihar Movement in 1974.

References 

1950 births
Living people
Rashtriya Janata Dal politicians
Bihar MLAs 2015–2020